Byataryanapura is  a suburb of Bangalore city in the state of Karnataka, India.

It is famous for Gali Aanjaneya Temple.

Demographics
 India census, Byatarayanapura had a population of 180,931. Males constitute 52% of the population and females 48%. Byatarayanapura has an average literacy rate of 73%, higher than the national average of 59.5%; with male literacy of 78% and female literacy of 67%. 12% of the population is under 6 years of age.

References

Neighbourhoods in Bangalore